This is a list of all railway stations in Thailand that are or was operated by State Railway of Thailand (SRT). This list does not include rapid transit stations of the BTS Skytrain, MRT and SRTET (Airport Rail Link) and SRT Red Lines.

Open Railway Stations and Halts 
The following table lists all open railway stations in Thailand as of September 2021 in English alphabetical order. All stations are on the Northern Line, Northeastern Line, Southern Line, Eastern Line or the Maeklong Railway and their respective branch lines.

Closed Railway Stations and Halts 
The following table lists all closed railway stations in Thailand as of September 2021 in English alphabetical order. The list does not include stations of the Burma Railway Nam Tok Sai Yok Noi-Thanbyuzayat which was demolished at the end of World War II. The list also does not include stations of railways not operated by the SRT, such as the Paknam Railway, the Phra Phutthabat Railway, the Bang Bua Thong Railway etc. The majority of railway stations/halts listed were present in the Station Code Book of 1 October 1979.

References 
 ฝ่ายการเดินรถ การรถไฟแห่งประเทศไทย. บัญชีรายชื่อสถานี/ที่หยุดรถ/ป้ายหยุดรถ/ระยะทาง/ชั้นสถานี/สังกัด. ม.ป.ท. (ไม่ปรากฏสถานที่พิมพ์), 2553 
https://procurement.railway.co.th/main/knowledge/Route.html
https://www.prachachat.net/property/news-516518
https://www.railway.co.th/RailwayMiddleFile/NewsAndActImg/1443/132067701355051124_2562-4.pdf
http://eiadoc.onep.go.th/eia/KM12.pdf
http://portal.rotfaithai.com/modules.php?name=Forums&file=viewtopic&t=2665
http://portal.rotfaithai.com/modules.php?name=Forums&file=viewtopic&t=771
http://portal.rotfaithai.com/modules.php?name=Forums&file=viewtopic&t=1389
http://portal.rotfaithai.com/modules.php?name=Forums&file=viewtopic&t=2531&postdays=0&postorder=asc&start=10

Thailand
Railway stations
Railway stations